Boriss Timofejevs (born September 4, 1957 in Riga) is a Latvian sport shooter. He competed in the 1992, 1996, and 2000 Summer Olympics. At the 1992 Olympics, he tied for 11th place in the skeet event. At the 1996 Olympics, he placed 6th in the men's skeet event. At the 2000 Olympics, he tied for 12th place in the men's skeet event.

References

External links
 
 
 

1957 births
Living people
Skeet shooters
Latvian male sport shooters
Shooters at the 1992 Summer Olympics
Shooters at the 1996 Summer Olympics
Shooters at the 2000 Summer Olympics
Olympic shooters of Latvia